C.E. JEATT & SONS LIMITED, trading as White Bus Services (sometimes shortened to White Bus), is a bus operator based in Berkshire and runs bus and coach hire services within Windsor and Ascot. It is part of the Rowgate Group.

History 
White Bus Services was founded by George Ackroyd in July 1922 in Winkfield as the Republic Bus Company, introducing a service linking Windsor and Ascot. Ackroyd ran the business until selling it to William Rule Jeatt in 1930, renaming it as White Bus Services. The company would continue to be run by the Jeatt family for over 80 years, passing down to Cecil Jeatt, then in 1972 to his son Doug Jeatt.

In 1932, a new service was introduced that skirted the edge of Windsor Great Park. By 1936 buses were running through the park itself and White Bus remains as the only operator to provide a public transport link into the park.

The private hire side of the business became a separate company in 1955, despite continuing to share the same site, operating as Winkfield Coaches. The two companies were re-amalgamated in 1990.

White Bus further expanded in 1987 when it acquired vehicles and contracted school services from A. Moore & Sons (trading as Imperial) in Windsor upon the company's closure. This, alongside the introduction of free school transport for eligible pupils, has led to White Bus developing a network of school services in Windsor, Ascot, Maidenhead and Wokingham.

In 2014, White Bus was awarded contracts to operate routes P1 and W1.

Acquisition by Rowgate Group 
White Bus Services was sold to Fernhill Travel of Bracknell in November 2016, which is managed by Rowgate Group's chairman, Simon Rowland.

In 2017, following Abellio's departure from Surrey bus operations, White Bus were awarded contracts in the Staines area for routes 438, 566/567 and Sunday operations of routes 446 and 456. It also registered the Monday to Saturday service of the 446 commercially. Later, it commercially took over route 441 from Abellio in March 2018.

In September 2018, White Bus won more contracts from Surrey County Council, mainly in the Woking area, taking over routes 437, 462/463 and two morning journeys on route 81 from Arriva Guildford & West Surrey. It also took over routes 48 and 500 from Dickson Travel of Frimley Green. Five more Alexander Dennis Enviro200 MMCs joined the fleet, these being the 8.9m examples to Euro VI specification.

To celebrate their centenary anniversary, White Bus bought two 10.8 m variants of the same model which arrived in January 2020.

Services 
As of January 2023, White Bus Services runs 19 public services. The majority of the routes would start at Staines, Windsor or Woking and would terminate elsewhere within Berkshire or Surrey.

Fleet 

White Bus Services were known for its wide fleet of Bedford buses, the last of which finally departed in October 2008. From the 1990s until Rowgate's acquisition, White Bus' fleet consisted mainly of Optare buses. In the late 2010s, White Bus gradually replaced the Optare fleet with Alexander Dennis Enviro200s or new Enviro200 MMC buses.

The buses that are used for public routes are ADL and Optare products.

Incidents 
On 24 January 2019, the company reduced its 441 service from Staines to Englefield Green following minor damage to the inside of the bus where youths were throwing snowballs with stones at the bus on service. Police were notified of the incident, however no arrests were made.

References

External links 
 Company Website

Transport in Berkshire
Bus operators in Berkshire